Negative result may refer to:
 Proof of impossibility, a proof that a particular problem cannot be solved
 Null result, a result which shows no evidence of the intended effect
Null hypothesis, a hypothesis that there is no relationship between two measured phenomena